Asaph Daniel Schwapp (January 26, 1987 – May 8, 2013) was an American fullback.

Schwapp was born and raised in Hartford, Connecticut. He played high school football at Weaver High School in Hartford where he earned first team all-state honors and named Gatorade Player of the Year in Connecticut in 2004 as a junior. He also played inside linebacker. He attended and played football at The University of Notre Dame. He entered the NFL signing as an undrafted free agent by the Dallas Cowboys in 2009 but was cut before the regular season began.

In 2010, he signed with the Hartford Colonials. On August 10, 2011, the Colonials were contracted by the UFL, thus Schwapp became a free agent.

On May 8, 2013, Schwapp died after battling non-Hodgkin's lymphoma.

References

External links 
Just Sports Stats
 http://www.und.com/sports/m-footbl/schwapp_asaph00.html
 https://web.archive.org/web/20100802035713/http://www.ufl-football.com/news/andre-dixon-and-asaph-schwapp-model-2010-hartford-colonials-uniforms-las-vegas-show
 http://sports.espn.go.com/ncf/player/profile?playerId=174097
 http://www.cbssports.com/nfl/draft/players/563659
 https://web.archive.org/web/20110611045231/http://www.ufl-football.com/hartford-colonials/player-roster/schwapp-asaph

1987 births
Players of American football from Hartford, Connecticut
American football fullbacks
Notre Dame Fighting Irish football players
Hartford Colonials players
Deaths from non-Hodgkin lymphoma
2013 deaths
Deaths from cancer in Connecticut